Robert M. Arkin (Ph.D., University of Southern California) is a social psychologist and member of the social program faculty at Ohio State University.  He is primarily known for his research on self-handicapping.

Research 

Arkin’s research concerns the self in social interaction, with special emphasis on the uncertain self (self-doubt; self-handicapping and overachievement; personal security and insecurity in the post 9/11 era).  Arkin developed the Subjective Overachievement Scale  more than a decade ago to tap feelings of self-doubt coupled with a performance outcome concerns.  He is Editor of the 2011 book "Most Underappreciated: 50 Prominent Social Psychologists Describe Their Most Unloved Work", Handbook of the Uncertain Self (with co-editors Kathryn Oleson and Patrick Carroll), and the forthcoming Handbook of Personal Security (with co-editors Patrick Carroll and Aaron Wichman).

Honors and Distinctions 

Arkin is a member of the Society for Experimental Social Psychology. Arkin has served more than fourteen years as Associate Editor (Journal of Personality and Social Psychology; Personality and Social Psychology Bulletin) and Editor (Basic and Applied Social Psychology) of major journals in the discipline.  Other honors include: The Middlebush Chair in Psychology (University of Missouri); serving as Undergraduate Dean (The Ohio State University); several Department, University and national teaching awards, including the Psi Chi National Distinguished Speaker Award in 2001.

External links 

Arkin’s Ohio State Faculty profile 
Arkin’s Laboratory of the Uncertain Self 
Arkin’s Social Psychology Network page

References 

Year of birth missing (living people)
Living people
University of Missouri faculty